Christian Democratic Union may refer to:

Christian Democratic Union (Armenia)
Christian Democratic Union (Belize), a former trade union
Christian Democratic Union (Bolivia)
Christian Democratic Union (Dominican Republic)
Christian Democratic Union (East Germany)
Christian Democratic Union (Ecuador)
Christian Democratic Union of Germany
Christian Democratic Union (Latvia)
Christian Democratic Union (Lebanon)
Christian Democratic Union (Lithuania)
Christian Democratic Union (Namibia)
Christian Democratic Union (Netherlands)
Christian Democratic Union (Ukraine)
Christian and Democratic Union (Czech Republic)

See also 
 Christian Democratic Party (disambiguation)
 List of Christian democratic parties